Waters Upton is a civil parish in the district of Telford and Wrekin, Shropshire, England.  It contains 29 listed buildings that are recorded in the National Heritage List for England.  Of these, two are at Grade II*, the middle of the three grades, and the others are at Grade II, the lowest grade.  The parish includes the villages of Waters Upton, Crudgington and Great Bolas, and is otherwise rural.  Most of the listed buildings are houses and cottages and associated structures, farmhouses and farm buildings, the earliest of which are timber framed.  The other listed buildings include two churches and associated structures, and a bridge.


Key

Buildings

References

Citations

Sources

Lists of buildings and structures in Shropshire